The Michigan Tech Huskies men's ice hockey team is an NCAA Division I college ice hockey program that represents Michigan Technological University. The Huskies are a member of the Central Collegiate Hockey Association (CCHA). They play at the MacInnes Student Ice Arena in Houghton, Michigan.

The Huskies host and compete in the annual Great Lakes Invitational held in December of each year. The four-team tournament was played for the 50th year in 2014.

History

Michigan Tech has had a storied history from its inception in 1919, producing three national championships. The program has played in five different home arenas including the Amphidrome, Calumet Colosseum, Dee Stadium and the MacInnes Student Ice Arena.

The program is a charter member of the WCHA in 1951 and became a national powerhouse under the leadership of Coach John MacInnes during the 1960s, 1970s, and early 1980s.

The team has won three NCAA Division I championships (1962, 1965, and 1975) and seven Western Collegiate Hockey Association championships (1962, 1965, 1969, 1971, 1974, 1976, and 2016).

Conferences
None (1919–51, 1958–59)
Midwest Collegiate Hockey League/Western Intercollegiate Hockey League/Western Collegiate Hockey Association (1951–58, 1959–81, 1984–2021)
Central Collegiate Hockey Association (1981–84, 2021–present)

NCAA Championships

Season-by-season results

Source:

Coaches
As of today

* indicates former Huskies player
† Tim Watters was fired in November 2000 after a 1–7–1 start.

Pageantry 
Huskies hockey fans associate many traditional songs with hockey games. Some of these songs include "The Engineer's Song," verses other than the first to "In Heaven There Is No Beer" and "Blue Skirt Waltz" (stylized as "The Copper Country Anthem"). Student organizations associated with hockey fandom include the student fan section Mitch's Misfits, and DaWGs, the official group representing the Huskies Pep Band.

Arena
John J. MacInnes Student Ice Arena: (1972–present)
Name: Student Ice Arena (1972–91), John J. MacInnes Student Ice Arena (1991–present)
Capacity: 4,200
Constructed: 1971
Dedication and first game: January 14, 1972
Renovated: 1999, 2009

Top single-game crowds
4,619 vs Michigan: February 7, 1976
4,563 vs Denver: February 4, 1978
4,551 vs Denver: February 3, 1978

Top weekend series crowds
9,131 vs Michigan: February 6–7, 1976
9,114 vs Denver: February 3–4, 1978
8,992 vs Michigan State: February 1–2, 1974

Statistical leaders
Source:

Career points leaders

Career goaltending leaders

GP = Games played; Min = Minutes played; W = Wins; L = Losses; T = Ties; GA = Goals against; SO = Shutouts; SV% = Save percentage; GAA = Goals against average

Minimum 30 games

Statistics current through the start of the 2021–22 season.

Players and personnel

Current roster
As of August 26, 2022.

Staff

Awards and honors

Hockey Hall of Fame
The following Michigan Tech Huskies have been elected to the Hockey Hall of Fame.
Tony Esposito (player, 1988)

United States Hockey Hall of Fame
The following Michigan Tech Huskies have been elected to the United States Hockey Hall of Fame.

George Owen (coach, 1973)
Amo Bessone (coach, 1992)
Paul Coppo (player, 2004)
John MacInnes (coach, 2007)

NCAA

Spencer Penrose Award
John MacInnes: 1970, 1976

Tournament Most Outstanding Player
Lou Angotti: 1960, 1962
Gary Milroy: 1965
Jim Warden: 1975

All-Americans
First Team

1936–37: Ed Maki
1950–51: Joe deBastiani, D
1952–53: Bob Monahan, D
1958–59: John Kosiancic, F
1959–60: George Cuculick, G; Paul Coppo, F
1961–62: Henry Åkervall, D; Elov Seger, D; Lou Angotti, F; Jerry Sullivan, F
1962–63: Garry Bauman, G; George Hill, F
1963–64: Garry Bauman, G
1964–65: Tony Esposito, G
1965–66: Tony Esposito, G; Bruce Riutta, D
1966–67: Tony Esposito, G; Rick Best, G; Bruce Riutta, D; Gary Milroy, F
1968–69: Al Karlander, F
1970–71: Morris Trewin, G; Bob Murray, D
1973–74: Jim Nahrgang, D; Mike Zuke, F
1974–75: Bob D'Alvise, F
1975–76: Mike Zuke, F
1980–81: Tim Watters, D
1992–93: Jamie Ram, G
1993–94: Jamie Ram, G
2014–15: Tanner Kero, F

Second Team

1951–52: Joe deBastiani, D
1954–55: Jack McManus, F
1955–56: Jack McManus, F
1989–90: Kip Noble, D
2004–05: Colin Murphy, F
2015–16: Alex Petan, F
2021–22: Brian Halonen, F

WCHA

Individual awards

Player of the Year
Bob Murray: 1971
Mike Zuke: 1976
Tanner Kero: 2015
Alex Petan: 2016

Outstanding Student-Athlete of the Year
Geoff Sarjeant: 1992
Eli Vlaisavljevich: 2010
Tanner Kero: 2015
Jamie Phillips: 2016

Sophomore of the Year
Lou Angotti: 1960
George Hill: 1963
Gary Milroy: 1965

Coach of the Year
John MacInnes: 1960, 1962, 1966, 1971, 1976
Herb Boxer: 1988
Jamie Russell: 2007
Mel Pearson: 2012, 2016

Freshman of the Year
Mike Usitalo: 1971
Mike Zuke: 1973

Defensive Player of the Year
Andy Sutton: 1998

Most Valuable Player in Tournament
Shane Hanna: 2017
Patrick Munson: 2018

All-Conference Teams
First Team All-WCHA

1954–55: Bob McManus, G
1955–56: Jack McManus, F
1959–60: Henry Åkervall, G; John Kosiancic, F
1961–62: Garry Bauman, D; Henry Åkervall, D; Lou Angotti, F; Jerry Sullivan, F
1962–63: Garry Bauman, G; George Hill, F
1963–64: Garry Bauman, G; Norm Wimmer, D
1964–65: Tony Esposito, G
1965–66: Tony Esposito, G; Bruce Riutta, D
1966–67: Tony Esposito, G
1968–69: Al Karlander, F
1970–71: Morris Trewin, G; Bob Murray, D
1973–74: Jim Nahrgang, D; Mike Zuke, F
1974–75: Jim Warden, G; Bob D'Alvise, F
1975–76: George Lyle, F; Mike Zuke, F
1980–81: Tim Watters, D
1988–89: Shawn Harrison, F
1989–90: Kip Noble, D
1992–93: Jamie Ram, G
1993–94: Jamie Ram, G
1997–98: Andre Savage, F
2004–05: Colin Murphy, F
2014–15: Jamie Phillips, G; Tanner Kero, F
2015–16: Alex Petan, F
2016–17: Matt Roy, D

Second Team All-WCHA

1951–52: Joe deBastiani, D
1952–53: Joe deBastiani, F
1954–55: Jack McManus, F
1955–56: Bob McManus, G
1956–57: Jack McManus, F; Tom Kennedy, F
1959–60: George Cuculick, G; Gerald Fabbro, F; Paul Coppo, F
1960–61: Bill Rowe, G; Henry Åkervall, D; Lou Angotti, F; Jerry Sullivan, F
1961–62: Elov Seger, D; Gene Rebellato, F
1962–63: Gary Begg, D; John Ivanitz, F
1963–64: Scott Watson, F; George Hill, F
1964–65: Dennis Huculak, D; Gary Milroy, F
1965–66: Dennis Huculak, D; Wayne Weller, F
1966–67: Rick Best, G; Bruce Riutta, D; Bob Toothill, F; Gary Milroy, F
1967–68: Dick Sieradzki, D; Al Karlander, F
1970–71: Mike Usitalo, F
1972–73: Jim Nahrgang, D
1973–74: Rick Quance, G; Lorne Stamler, F
1974–75: Bob Lorimer, D; Mike Zuke, F
1975–76: John Rockwell, G; Gord Salt, F
1987–88: John Archibald, F
1990–91: Kelly Hurd, F
1992–93: John Young, F
1997–98: Andy Sutton, D
2003–04: Chris Conner, F
2004–05: Lars Helminen, D
2014–15: Alex Petan, F; Malcolm Gould, F
2015–16: Jamie Phillips, G; Matt Roy, D
2016–17: Shane Hanna, D
2020–21: Colin Swoyer, D

Third Team All-WCHA

1996–97: Andre Savage, F
2004–05: Cam Ellsworth, G
2006–07: Michael-Lee Teslak, G
2014–15: Shane Hanna, D; Blake Pietila, F
2015–16: Shane Hanna, D; Malcolm Gould, F; Tyler Heinonen, F
2016–17: Tyler Heinonen, F
2017–18: Mitch Reinke, D
2019–20: Matt Jurusik, G
2020–21: Trenton Bliss, F

All-WCHA Rookie Team

1990–91: Jamie Ram, G
1992–93: Jason Wright, D; Pat Mikesch, F
2012–13: Alex Petan, F
2013–14: Shane Hanna, D
2015–16: Jake Lucchini, F
2016–17: Angus Redmond, G; Mitch Reinke, D
2017–18: Mitch Reinke, D
2018–19: Brian Halonen, F
2020–21: Arvid Caderoth, F

CCHA

Individual awards

Player of the Year
 Blake Pietila: 2023

Goaltender of the Year
 Blake Pietila: 2023

Rookie of the Year
 Kyle Kukkonen: 2023

Coach of the Year
 Joe Shawhan: 2023

All-Conference Teams
First Team All-CCHA

2021–22: Brian Halonen, F
2022–23: Blake Pietila, G; Ryland Mosley, F

Second Team All-CCHA

2021–22: Blake Pietila, G; Colin Swoyer, D; Trenton Bliss, F
2022–23: Brett Thorne, D

All-CCHA Rookie Team

2022–23: Kyle Kukkonen, F

Michigan Tech Hall of Fame
The following is a list of people associated with Michigan Tech 's men's ice hockey program who were elected into the Michigan Tech University Athletic Hall of Fame (induction date in parenthesis).

1961–62 Team (2012)
1964–65 Team (2014)
1974–75 Team (2016)
Henry Åkervall (1990)
Lou Angotti (1991)
Garry Bauman (1992)
Russ Becker (2010)
Gary Begg (1997)
Rick Best (1994)
Tom Bissett (2014)
Rick Boehm (2000)
Herb Boxer (2009)
Peter Buchmann (1987)
Steve Coates (2018)
Paul Coppo (1985)
George Cuculick (1998)
Bob D'Alvise (1989)
Joe deBastiani (2000)
Tony Esposito (1990)
Gerald Fabbro (2005)
Dan Farrell (2011)
Peter Grant (2005)
John Grisdale (1997)
Fred Hall (2001)
Bob Hauswirth (1994)
George Hill (2001)
Bruce Horsch (2007)
Art Karam (1987)
Al Karlander (1990)
John Kosiancic (1994)
Doug Latimer (1986)
Bob Lorimer (1992)
George Lyle (1993)
John MacInnes (1985)
Abbie Maki (1987)
Ed Maki (1985)
Randy McKay (1999)
Al McLeod (2008)
Bob McManus (2001)
Jack McManus (1995)
Gary Milroy (2004)
Bob Monahan (1993)
Bob Murray (1996)
Jim Nahrgang (1989)
Ken Naples (2003)
Kip Noble (2018)
Allan Olson (1991)
Marcus Olson (1986)
Ted Olson (2003)
Stu Ostlund (2002)
Ken Pelto (2001)
Brent Peterson (2016)
Ray Puro (2004)
Jamie Ram (2010)
Damian Rhodes (2006)
Bruce Riutta (1987)
John Rockwell (2006)
Elov Seger (1998)
Bill Steele (2012)
Jerry Sullivan (1986)
Bill Terry (2011)
Mike Usitalo (2008)
Maurice Villeneuve(1988)
Jim Warden (2007)
Tim Watters (1997)
Glen Weller (2005)
Scott White (2016)
Rick Yeo (1988)
John Young (2008)
Mike Zuke (1988)

Huskies in the NHL
As of July 1, 2022.

WHA
Several players also were members of WHA teams.

Source:

Olympians
This is a list of Michigan Tech alumni were a part of an Olympic team.

See also 
 Michigan Tech Huskies

References

External links
 

 
Ice hockey teams in Michigan